Germán Guiffrey (born 31 December 1997) is an Argentine professional footballer who plays as a centre-back for Gimnasia La Plata.

Career
Guiffrey started his career with Club Salto Grande, prior to spells with Newell's Old Boys and Gimnasia y Esgrima. He made his senior debut for Gimnasia y Esgrima in a Copa Argentina tie with Sportivo Belgrano in July 2018. He was subsequently moved into the club's senior squad during the 2018–19 Argentine Primera División campaign, initially appearing as an unused substitute for games against Talleres, Patronato and Unión Santa Fe. Guiffrey's professional league debut arrived on 27 October 2018 in a fixture with Boca Juniors, he featured for the full duration of a 2–1 win.

Career statistics
.

References

External links

1997 births
Living people
Argentine people of French descent
People from Concordia, Entre Ríos
Argentine footballers
Association football defenders
Argentine Primera División players
Club de Gimnasia y Esgrima La Plata footballers
Sportspeople from Entre Ríos Province